The Taman Midah station is a mass rapid transit (MRT) station on the MRT Kajang Line, serving the neighbourhood of Taman Midah and the surrounding residential areas in the suburb of Cheras, Kuala Lumpur, Malaysia. It was opened on 17 July 2017.

The station is located directly above Federal Route 1 Jalan Cheras  near the site of the former Jalan Cheras toll plaza.

Station Background

Station Layout
The station has a layout and design similar to that of most other elevated stations on the line (except the terminus and underground stations), with the platform level on the topmost floor, consisting of two sheltered side platforms along a double tracked line and a single concourse housing ticketing facilities between the ground level and the platform level. All levels are linked by lifts, stairways and escalators.

Exits and entrances
The station has two entrances, located on both sides of Federal Route 1 Jalan Cheras. Each entrance has separate feeder bus service line. Therefore, passengers are advised to ensure the correct entrance for the feeder bus line which they are going.

Bus Services

MRT Feeder Bus Services
With the opening of the MRT Kajang Line, feeder buses also began operating linking the station with several housing and commercial areas around the Bandar Tun Razak, Bandar Sri Permaisuri, Taman Midah, Taman Sri Bahtera, Kampung Cheras Baru, Pandan, Ampang and Sri Nilam area.

The feeder bus lines in this station are operating in each of the entrances. Therefore, passengers are advised to ensure the correct entrance for the feeder bus line which they are going.

Other Bus Services 
The MRT Taman Midah station also provides accessibility for some other bus services.

Park and Ride
Taman Midah MRT station has an adjoining multi-level park and ride facility which is located adjacent to Maybank (Taman Midah Branch) and is connected to Entrance A via a covered pedestrian link bridge. This facility has 1,355 car parking lots and 259 motorcycle parking lots. MRT users are charged a flat rate per entry per day; RM4.30 for car and RM1.10 for motorcycle. Parking payment must be made using the same Touch ‘n Go card used for the MRT ride in order to enjoy the flat rate.

References

External links

 Taman Midah MRT Station
 Klang Valley Mass Rapid Transit

Rapid transit stations in Kuala Lumpur
Sungai Buloh-Kajang Line
Railway stations opened in 2017